Pol-e Abgineh (also Romanized as Pol-e Ābgīneh; also known as Deh-i-Pul-i-Ābgīneh, Dehpol Ābgīneh, and Pol-e Āgīneh) is a village in Balyan Rural District, in the Central District of Kazerun County, Fars Province, Iran. At the 2006 census, its population was 365, in 83 families.

References 

Populated places in Kazerun County